A physiographic province is a geographic region with a characteristic geomorphology, and often specific subsurface rock type or structural elements.  The continents are subdivided into various physiographic provinces, each having a specific character, relief, and environment which contributes to its distinctiveness. The physiographic provinces are then subdivided into smaller physiographic sections.

Examples
In eastern North America, the Atlantic Coastal Plain, Piedmont, Blue Ridge Mountains, Ridge-and-Valley Appalachians, and Appalachian Plateau are specific physiographic provinces.

In the Western United States of western North America: the Basin and Range Province, Cascade Range, Colorado Plateau, Rio Grande rift, Great Basin, Central Valley (California), Peninsular Ranges, Los Angeles Basin, and Transverse Ranges are examples of physiographic provinces.

See also
Physiographic provinces — index
Physiographic sections — index
 Physiographic regions of the world  — chart with physiographic provinces and sections by continent.
 Physiographic regions of Mexico
 Physiographic regions of the United States
 Geologic province
Geologic provinces of the United States

References

 

Geography terminology
Geomorphology
Geologic provinces
Physical geography
Physiographic divisions